Urosalpinx trossula is an extinct species of sea snail, a marine gastropod mollusk in the family Muricidae, the murex snails or rock snails.

Description

Distribution
Fossils were found in Miocene strata of Virginia, USA.

References

 Cossmann (M.), 1903 - Essais de Paléoconchologie comparée. Livraison 5, p. 1-215 
 Korobkov (I.A.), 1955 - Spravochnik I methodicheskoe revodstvo po tretichnym molliuskam. Briuckhonologie [= Manuel et guide des Mollusques tertiaires, Gastéropodes], p. 1-795
 Blackwelder, Blake W. "Late Cenozoic stages and molluscan zones of the US Middle Atlantic Coastal Plain." Journal of Paleontology 55.S12 (1981): 1-34.

External links
 

trossula
Gastropods described in 1832